Liu Guijin (born August 1945) is a retired Chinese diplomat who served as Chinese ambassador to South Africa between 2001 and 2007 and Chinese ambassador to Zimbabwe between 1995 and 1998.

Biography
Liu was born in Yuncheng County, Shandong, in August 1945. He graduated from Shanghai International Studies University. He joined the Communist Party of China in August 1971.

Liu joined the Foreign Service in 1972 and has served primarily in Africa. Since 1981, he worked at the Chinese Embassy in Kenya. He returned to China in 1986 and was despatched to the Africa Department of the Ministry of Foreign Affairs. In 1990, he became Chinese counsellor in Ethiopia. Three years later, he returned to China and was appointed deputy director of the Africa Department of the Ministry of Foreign Affairs. In December 1995, he succeeded Gu Xin'er as Chinese Ambassador to Zimbabwe, serving in that position from 1995 to 1998. Then he was appointed director of the Africa Department of the Ministry of Foreign Affairs. In March 2001, President Hu Jintao appointed him Chinese ambassador to South Africa, a post in which he served from 2001 to 2007. On 10 May 2007, he became the first Special Representative of the Chinese Government on African Affairs.

Awards
2021 July 1 Medal

References

1945 births
Living people
People from Yuncheng County
Shanghai International Studies University alumni
Diplomats of the People's Republic of China